Abu ʾl-Faḍl Jaʿfar ibn Muḥammad (AD 1052/3–1139 [AH 444–534]) was an Andalusi Arab poet and aphorist from Kairouan. He moved to al-Andalus with his father, Ibn Sharaf, in 1057. He served as a vizier to Muḥammad al-Muʿtaṣim of Almería. His works are mainly lost, but he is known to have composed in the panegyric and gnomic genres of poetry. He penned two collections of aphorisms and maxims in both prose and verse, Nujḥ al-nuṣḥ and Sirr al-birr. He wrote an urjūza on asceticism. A few of his poems are quoted in anthologies and Ibn Bassām preserves a few verses and vizierial letters. He had a son, Abū ʿAbdallāh Muḥammad, who was also a gnomic poet, according to al-Maqqarī.

Notes

1050s births
1139 deaths
People from Kairouan
11th-century Arabic poets
12th-century Arabic poets
11th-century Arabs
12th-century Arabs